This article is about the demographic features of the population of Cape Verde, including population density, ethnicity, education level, health of the populace, economic status, religious affiliations and other aspects of the population.

Cape Verde has a population of about 540,000 inhabitants who live in the islands. A large proportion (236,000) of Cape Verdeans live on the main island, Santiago. Many more live abroad in the Cape Verdean diaspora in mainland Africa, Europe, U.S., Brazil, et cetera.

The archipelago of Cape Verde were first found and claimed by Portuguese sailors working for the Portuguese Crown in 1456. Cape Verdeans are West African. Many foreigners from other parts of the world settled in Cape Verde as their permanent country. 

Survival in a country with few natural resources has historically induced Cape Verdeans to emigrate. In fact, of the more than 1 million people of Cape Verdean ancestry in the world, only a little more than one-third actually live on the islands. Some 500,000 people of Cape Verdean ancestry live in the United States, mainly in New England. Many people of Cape Verdean ancestry also live in Portugal, Netherlands, France, Italy and Senegal. Cape Verdean populations also settled Spain, Germany, Canada, and other CPLP countries (Angola, Brazil and Guinea-Bissau). Since independence from Portugal in 1975, a number of Cape Verdean students continued to be admitted every year at Portuguese high schools, polytechnical institutes and universities, through bilateral agreements between the Portuguese and Cape Verdean governments.

Portuguese functions as a state language. Virtually all formal documents and official declarations are stated in Portuguese. But it is not the first language. Cape Verdean, commonly called Kriolu, is spoken as a mother tongue by virtually all Cape Verdeans, irrespective of social status or religious affiliation. Moreover, historical linguists often attribute Cape Verdean Creole as the oldest "New World" contact language. It is a "contact" language in the sense that it was birthed and evolved between linguistically different groups who, by necessity, had to create a common language to communicate with each other. There is a rich repertoire of literature and songs in Cape Verdean Creole. In religion, the majority of Cape Verdeans follow Catholic Christianity. There are some Protestants, Baháʼís and Muslims.

Population

The proportion of children below the age of 15 in 2010 was 31.8%, 62.3% was between 15 and 65 years of age, while 5.9% was 65 years or older.

Vital statistics
Vital events of Cape Verde are not (yet) available for recent years. The Population Department of the United Nations prepared the following estimates.

Births and deaths

Fertility and births
Total fertility rate (TFR) (wanted fertility rate) and crude birth rate (CBR):

Fertility data from 2005 (DHS Program):

Life expectancy

Other demographic statistics

Demographic statistics according to the World Population Review in 2022.

One birth every 51 minutes	
One death every 160 minutes	
One net migrant every 480 minutes	
Net gain of one person every 90 minutes

The following demographic statistics are from the CIA World Factbook.

Population
596,707 (2022 est.)
568,373 (July 2018 est.)

Age structure

0-14 years: 27.95% (male 82,010/female 81,012)
15-24 years: 18.69% (male 54,521/female 54,504)
25-54 years: 40.76% (male 115,811/female 121,923)
55-64 years: 7.12% (male 18,939/female 22,597)
65 years and over: 5.48% (male 12,037/female 19,901) (2020 est.)

0-14 years: 28.7% (male 82,035 /female 81,082)
15-24 years: 19.64% (male 55,811 /female 55,798)
25-54 years: 40.02% (male 110,646 /female 116,804)
55-64 years: 6.4% (male 16,154 /female 20,245)
65 years and over: 5.24% (male 11,272 /female 18,526) (2018 est.)

Median age
total: 26.8 years. Country comparison to the world: 151st
male: 25.9 years
female: 27.6 years (2020 est.)

total: 25.8 years. Country comparison to the world: 153rd
male: 25 years 
female: 26.7 years (2018 est.)

Total: 23.1 years
Male: 22.3 years
Female: 23.9 years (2012 est.)

Population growth rate
1.21% (2022 est.) Country comparison to the world: 76th
1.32% (2018 est.) Country comparison to the world: 83rd

Total fertility rate
2.13 children born/woman (2022 est.) Country comparison to the world: 92nd
2.21 children born/woman (2018 est.) Country comparison to the world: 95th

Birth rate
18.49 births/1,000 population (2022 est.) Country comparison to the world: 79th
19.7 births/1,000 population (2018 est.) Country comparison to the world: 79th

Death rate
5.8 deaths/1,000 population (2022 est.) Country comparison to the world: 168th
6 deaths/1,000 population (2018 est.) Country comparison to the world: 163rd

Net migration rate
-0.57 migrant(s)/1,000 population (2022 est.) Country comparison to the world: 126th
-0.6 migrant(s)/1,000 population (2017 est.) Country comparison to the world: 128th

Urbanization

urban population: 67.5% of total population (2022)
rate of urbanization: 1.83% annual rate of change (2020-25 est.)

urban population: 65.7% of total population (2018)
rate of urbanization: 1.97% annual rate of change (2015-20 est.)

Contraceptive prevalence rate
55.8% (2018)

Sex ratio
At birth: 1.03 male(s)/female
Under 15 years: 1.01 male(s)/female
15-64 years: 0.97 male(s)/female
65 years and over: 0.58 male(s)/female
Total population: 0.95 male(s)/female (2009 est.)

Life expectancy at birth
total population: 73.75 years. Country comparison to the world: 144th
male: 71.41 years
female: 76.15 years (2022 est.)

total population: 72.7 years (2018 est.)
male: 70.3 years (2018 est.)
female: 75.1 years (2018 est.) Country comparison to the world: 147th

Total population: 71 years
Male: 68.78 years
Female: 73.27 years (2012 est.)

HIV/AIDS
Adult prevalence rate: 0.035% (2001 est.)
People living with HIV/AIDS: 775 (2001)
Deaths: 225 (as of 2001)

Genetics
E1b1a, R1b

The predominance of West African mitochondrial DNA haplotypes in their maternal gene pool, the major West African Y-chromosome lineage E3a was observed only at a frequency of 15.9%. Overall, these results indicate that gene flow from multiple sources and sex-specific patterns have been important in the formation of the genomic diversity in the Cabo Verde islands.

Religions

Catholic 77.3%, Protestant 3.7% (includes Church of the Nazarene 1.7%, Adventist 1.5%, Universal Kingdom of God 0.4%, and God and Love 0.1%), other Christian 4.3% (includes Christian Rationalism 1.9%, Jehovah's Witness 1%, Assembly of God 0.9%, and New Apostolic 0.5%), Islam 1.8%, Other 1.3%, None 10.8%, Unspecified 0.7% (2010 estimate)

Languages
Portuguese (official), Kriolu

Literacy
Definition: age 15 and over can read and write
Total population: 76.6%
Male: 85.8%
Female: 69.2% (2003 est.)

School life expectancy (primary to tertiary education)
total: 13 years
male: 12 years
female: 13 years (2018)

total: 12 years (2017)
male: 12 years (2017)
female: 12 years (2017)

Dependency ratios
total dependency ratio: 55.4 (2015 est.)
youth dependency ratio: 48.4 (2015 est.)
elderly dependency ratio: 6.9 (2015 est.)
potential support ratio: 14.4 (2015 est.)

See also

References

External links

 National Institute of Statistics
 Demographic Highlights — Statistics from the Population Reference Bureau

 
Society of Cape Verde